Mian Mehmood ur Rashid is a Pakistani politician who was the Provincial Minister of Punjab for Housing, Urban Development and Public Health Engineering, in office from 27 August 2018 till 28 March 2022. He had been a member of the Provincial Assembly of the Punjab from August 2018 to January 2023. Previously he was a Member of the Provincial Assembly of the Punjab from 1988 to 1993 and again from May 2013 to May 2018. He served as Leader of Opposition in the Provincial Assembly of the Punjab from June 2013 to May 2018

Early life and education
He was born on 21 April 1954 in Lahore to Arain Family.
He received the degree of Bachelor of Arts(Hons) in 1975 and a degree of Master of Arts in Economics in 1978 from University of the Punjab.

Political career
He was elected to the Provincial Assembly of the Punjab as a candidate of Islami Jamhoori Ittehad (IJI) from Constituency PP-127 (Lahore) in 1988 Pakistani general election. He received 26,729 votes and defeated a candidate of Pakistan Peoples Party (PPP).

He was re-elected to the Provincial Assembly of the Punjab as a candidate of IJI from Constituency PP-127 (Lahore) in 1990 Pakistani general election. He received 38,022 votes and defeated a candidate of Pakistan Democratic Alliance.

He ran for the seat of the Provincial Assembly of the Punjab as a candidate of the Pakistan Islamic Front from Constituency PP-127 (Lahore) in 1993 Pakistani general election, but was unsuccessful. He received 3,342 votes and lost the seat to a candidate of Pakistan Muslim League (N).

He was re-elected to the Provincial Assembly of the Punjab as a candidate of Pakistan Tehreek-e-Insaf (PTI) from Constituency PP-151 (Lahore-XV) in 2013 Pakistani general election. In June 2013, he was elected as the Leader of Opposition in the Provincial Assembly of the Punjab.

He was re-elected to the Provincial Assembly of the Punjab as a candidate of PTI from Constituency PP-160 (Lahore-XVII) in 2018 Pakistani general election.

On 27 August 2018, he was inducted into the provincial Punjab cabinet of Chief Minister Sardar Usman Buzdar and was appointed as Provincial Minister of Punjab for housing, urban development and public health engineering.

References

Punjab MPAs 2013–2018
Pakistan Tehreek-e-Insaf MPAs (Punjab)
Punjabi people
Politicians from Lahore
Living people
1954 births
Punjab MPAs 1988–1990
Punjab MPAs 1990–1993
Leaders of the Opposition in the Provincial Assembly of the Punjab
Provincial ministers of Punjab